Michael Arthur Delaney (born July 19, 1969) is an American lawyer and politician who served as the 28th New Hampshire Attorney General from 2009 to 2013. Delaney was appointed to the office of Attorney General by New Hampshire Governor John H. Lynch and decided not to seek reappointment by Governor Maggie Hassan at the end of his term, instead taking a position at the McLane Law Firm.

Early life
Delaney grew up as the youngest of five children in an Irish American Catholic family in Danvers, Massachusetts. His father, Arthur Delaney, was a probation officer. He graduated from St John's Preparatory School in 1987.

Delaney graduated from the College of the Holy Cross, receiving a Bachelor of Arts in political science in 1991, and Georgetown University Law Center, where he received a Juris Doctor in 1994.

Career
Delaney joined the law firm of Wiggin & Nourie in Manchester, New Hampshire in 1994 after graduating from law school; there, he specialized in business litigation.

He joined the New Hampshire Attorney General's office in 1999, initially serving as an assistant attorney general. Delaney then served as the Homicide Unit Chief in the office until 2004, when he became deputy attorney general. During this time, Delaney successfully prosecuted infamous murderers such as Gary Lee Sampson, who was sentenced to the death penalty, Joseph Whittey, and Robert Tulloch and James Parker.

Delaney served as deputy attorney general until 2006, when he left that post to become Governor Lynch's legal counsel. Lynch appointed Delaney New Hampshire Attorney General in 2009 after accepting the resignation of Kelly Ayotte. Delaney was sworn in on August 24, 2009, upon being unanimously confirmed by the Executive Council.

Under Delaney, the attorney general's office and the state banking department collaborated to create a new, state attorney-run fraud prevention unit within the state's Consumer Protection Bureau.

After leaving the attorney general's office, Delaney joined the law firm of McLane Middleton in its Manchester office, where he specializes in civil litigation and internal investigations, as well as advising schools on Title IX and compliance issues.

Delaney serves as the Co-Chair of the New Hampshire Campaign for Legal Services Leadership Council.

Nomination to court of appeals 
On January 18, 2023, President Joe Biden announced his intent to nominate Delaney to serve as a United States circuit judge of the United States Court of Appeals for the First Circuit. On January 31, 2023, his nomination was sent to the Senate. President Biden nominated him to a seat vacated by Judge Jeffrey R. Howard, who assumed senior status on March 31, 2022. His nomination is pending before the Senate Judiciary Committee. On February 15, 2023, a hearing on his nomination was held before the Senate Judiciary Committee. During the hearing, Delaney received criticism from senators regarding his authoring and filing of a motion seeking to strip a minor female rape victim of anonymity as part of representation of a New Hampshire private school at which she was a student in criminal and civil sex assault cases. The allegations were made by the victim of the 2015 assault in a letter to the panel. Owen Labrie was 18 years old at the time he was accused of raping the then 15-year-old student. Some Democrats have concerns about his nomination over his handling of a sexual assault case.

Personal life
Delaney resides in Manchester, New Hampshire with his wife, Caroline, and their three children.

References

External links
AG Michael Delaney: There were “deficiencies” in the Greenland drug raid, concordmonitor.com, December 15, 2012; accessed April 19, 2015.

1969 births
Living people
20th-century American lawyers
21st-century American lawyers
Catholics from New Hampshire
College of the Holy Cross alumni
Georgetown University Law Center alumni
New Hampshire Attorneys General
New Hampshire lawyers
People from Lynn, Massachusetts
Politicians from Manchester, New Hampshire